Sukumar Roy is an Indian politician from BJP. In May 2021, he was elected as the member of the West Bengal Legislative Assembly from Cooch Behar Uttar. He is now the district president of BJP Cooch Behar District.

Career
Roy is from Pundibari, Cooch Behar district. His father's name is Purna Chandra Roy. He contested in 2021 West Bengal Legislative Assembly election from Cooch Behar Uttar Vidhan Sabha and won the seat on 2 May 2021.

References

Year of birth missing (living people)
21st-century Indian politicians
People from Cooch Behar district
Bharatiya Janata Party politicians from West Bengal
West Bengal MLAs 2021–2026
Living people